Christopher Adler (born 1972) is an American musician, composer and professor of music.

Christopher Adler may also refer to:

Christopher Adler (lyricist) (1954–1984), American lyricist
Death of Christopher Alder (1960–1998), British ex-paratrooper who died in police custody
Chris Adler (born 1972), American drummer